Nizhnetseplyayevsky is a rural locality (a khutor) and the administrative center of Bolshinskoye Rural Settlement, Uryupinsky District, Volgograd Oblast, Russia. The population was 269 as of 2010. There are 2 streets.

Geography 
Nizhnetseplyayevsky is located 23 km northeast of Uryupinsk (the district's administrative centre) by road. Serkovsky is the nearest rural locality.

References 

Rural localities in Uryupinsky District